Stephano may refer to:

Fictional characters
Stephano (The Tempest), a drunkard in Shakespeare's The Tempest
An alias of Count Olaf in Lemony Snicket's A Series of Unfortunate Events

Other
Stephano (moon), a natural satellite of the planet Uranus

See also
Stefano, a name